The Ministry of Gender, Family and Children is a government ministry of the Democratic Republic of the Congo.

History
An Executive Secretariat responsible for gender was established by Presidential Order on 8 February 1980. As the General Secretariat for the Status of Women, this evolved into a branch of the state party, the Popular Movement of the Revolution (MPR). It became the Department of Women's Affairs in 1983, and was kept as the Department of Women's Affairs in the February 1985 Executive Council. In 1987 it was detached from the government, as the MPR Executive Secretariat with responsibility for gender.

In 1990 a Ministry for Gender was established. In 1992, it became the General Secretariat, and was attached to other Ministries: from 1992 to 1992, the Ministry of Health, National Solidarity, and the Family, and from 1994 to 2001, the Ministry for Health, Welfare, and Family Affairs. In 2003 the Ministry of Gender and Family was recreated, and in 2006 it became the Ministry of Gender, Family and Children.

Ministers
 Geneviève Inagosi (2012-2014)
 Bijou Mushitu Kat (2014-2015)
 Marie-Louise Mwange (2015-2017)
 Chantal Safou Lopussa (2017–2019)
 Béatrice Lomeya Atilite (2019-2021)
 Gisèle Ndaya Luseba (2021–present)

References

External links
 Ministere du genre, famille et enfant RDC

Government ministries of the Democratic Republic of the Congo
Women's ministries
1990 establishments in Zaire
Ministries established in 1990
Women in the Democratic Republic of the Congo
Women's rights in the Democratic Republic of the Congo